Beatrice Schenk de Regniers (August 16, 1914—March 1, 2000) was an American writer of children's picture books.

Beatrice Schenk de Regniers was born in Lafayette, Indiana, and studied social work administration at the University of Chicago, earning her M.Ed. in 1941. During the 1940s she worked in the US and in a Yugoslav refugee camp on the Sinai peninsula.

During the 1950s she was a free-lance writer of nonfiction, humor, short stories, and columns, as well as children's books. Her first book was The Giant Story, a picture book illustrated by Maurice Sendak, published by Harper in 1953.

From 1961 she worked at Scholastic, Inc. as the founding editor of its "Lucky Book Club", four days weekly with Monday reserved for her own writing. She retired twenty years later.

She wrote over fifty books, ten of which were published under the pseudonym of Tamara Kitt, including The Adventures of Silly Billy (1961), and The Boy Who Fooled the Giant (1963).

Illustrator Beni Montresor won the annual Caldecott Medal for May I Bring a Friend?, published by Atheneum Books in 1964.

Selected works

 The Giant Story (1953), jaQXVIgeby Maurice Sendak
 A Little House of Your Own (1954) — autobiography
 What Can You Do with a Shoe? (1955), illus. Maurice Sendak; recolored 1997
 The Snow Party (1959)
 The Little Girl and her Mother (1963; OCLC Number:  62439179)
 May I Bring a Friend? (1964), illus. Beni Montresor
 How Joe the Bear and Sam the Mouse Got Together (1965), illus. Brinton Turkle; (1990), illus. Bernice Myers
 Red Riding Hood: Retold in Verse for Boys and Girls to Read Themselves (1972), illus. Edward Gorey
 Laura's Story, illus. Jack Kent
 Penny (Lothrop, Lee & Shepard Books, 1987), illus. Betsy Lewin
 Sing a Song of Popcorn: Every Child's Book of Poems (1988), illus. Trina Schart Hyman, Marcia Brown, Margot Zemach, Maurice Sendak, Arnold Lobel, Marc Simont, Richard Egielski, and Leo and Diane Dillon

References

External links 

 
 Tamara Kitt at LC Authorities, with 4 records, and at WorldCat

American children's writers
1914 births
2000 deaths
Place of death missing
University of Chicago alumni
American expatriates in Egypt